Lycium sokotranum is a species of flowering plant in the nightshade family, Solanaceae, that is endemic to the Socotra archipelago in the Indian Ocean (Yemen). It is a spiny, much-branched shrub that is <2 m tall. It is widespread and often abundant on coastal plains and limestone plateaus of Socotra and on the central plains of Abd al Kuri.

References

sokotranum
Endemic flora of Socotra
Taxonomy articles created by Polbot